Saffordia is an extinct genus of bivalve mollusc of the order Modiomorphida. It lived during the middle to late Ordovician. Based on other members of it family, this clam was a stationary epifaunal suspension feeder. Its only species is Saffordia ventralis, which features a prominent escutcheon and is similar to – possibly synonymous with – Heikea. The clam can be distinguished from others due to its parallel shell haves with noticeable notches at the end.

References

Ordovician bivalves
Modiomorphidae
Prehistoric bivalve genera